Alexandra Papageorgiou (born December 17, 1980) is a hammer thrower from Athens, Greece. Her personal best throw is 70.73 metres, achieved on August 1, 2009, in Thessaloniki. This places her second on the Greek all-time list, behind Stiliani Papadopoulou.

Achievements

References

External links
 
 personal web page 

1980 births
Living people
Greek female hammer throwers
Athletes (track and field) at the 2004 Summer Olympics
Athletes (track and field) at the 2008 Summer Olympics
Olympic athletes of Greece
Panathinaikos Athletics
Mediterranean Games bronze medalists for Greece
Mediterranean Games medalists in athletics
Athletes (track and field) at the 2001 Mediterranean Games
Athletes (track and field) at the 2005 Mediterranean Games
Athletes from Athens
21st-century Greek women